The Isle of Wight Jewish Society, a member of the Movement for Reform Judaism, is a Jewish community in the Isle of Wight, England, UK. It was founded in June 2005 and became an associate member of  the Movement for Reform Judaism in June 2021. The community meets in members' homes.

References

External links
Jewish Small Communities: Isle of Wight Jewish Society

2005 establishments in England
Reform synagogues in the United Kingdom
Religion on the Isle of Wight